Yardım (literally "help, assistance, aid") is a Turkish surname and may refer to:
 Ahmet Cemil Yardım (1893–1966), Turkish politician 	
 Barbaros Yardım (born 1950), Turkish former footballer	
 Fahri Yardım (born 1980), Turkish-German actor	
 Mehmet Nuri Yardım (born 1960), Turkish journalist	
 Ümit Yardım (born 1961), Turkish diplomat

References	
	
	
	
Turkish-language surnames